Undress Your Madness is the sixteenth studio album by Danish hard rock/heavy metal Pretty Maids. The album was released on 8 November 2019 by Frontiers Records.

The album was written and recorded from January to February 2019. 

In October 2019, lead singer Ronnie Atkins announced that he had been diagnosed with lung cancer. As a result, the band had to postpone and eventually cancel the concert tour for the album.

Track listing

Personnel
Ronnie Atkins – vocals
Ken Hammer – guitar
René Shades – bass
Chris Laney – keyboards, guitar
Allan Sørensen – drums
Jacob Hansen – producer, engineer, mixer, mastering

Charts

References

2019 albums
Pretty Maids albums
Frontiers Records albums